Eleven Hours (1998) is a Thriller novel by author Paullina Simons.

Plot summary
On the eve of giving birth to her third child, Didi Wood goes to the mall to escape the Dallas heat and do a little shopping. She is supposed to meet her husband for lunch in an hour, but a chance encounter with a stranger changes everything. 
When Didi does not show up, Richard Wood first gets worried, then anxious, then frantic. And with good reason. His pregnant wife seems to have vanished off the face of the earth.

As the FBI joins Richard in a desperate search for his wife and unborn child, Didi’s terrifying eleven-hour ride takes her to the brink of all endurance and puts her on a collision course with fate itself.

External links
 eclectica.org

1998 American novels
American thriller novels
Novels set in Dallas
Novels set in one day